Ornithopsis (meaning "bird-likeness") was a medium-sized Early Cretaceous sauropod dinosaur, from England. The type species, which is the only species seen as valid today, is O. hulkei.

History of discovery

The bone was redescribed by Richard Owen in 1854, who reaffirmed its referral as a quadrate of Iguanodon, but also suggested it could be the same bone of Streptospondylus or Cetiosaurus as it was not directly associated with the characteristic teeth of Iguanodon. This specimen is stored as British Museum of Natural History R2239, having been purchased from Mantell in 1838.

BMNH R28632, a similar bone to BMNH R2239 was described in 1870 by Harry Govier Seeley, found in the deposits on the Isle of Wight and purchased from Mantell by the British Museum in 1853. Seeley gave the name Ornithopsis hulkei for the vertebrae, named in honour of his colleague John Whitaker Hulke, considering the taxon to be between pterosaurs and birds, and possibly allied with dinosaurs.

Owen revisisted the material in 1875, where he described multiple new species within his new genus Bothriospondylus. Agreeing with the vertebral identity of BMNH R2239, but considering it closer to the type species Bothriospondylus suffossus than any flying animal as Seeley had suggested, Owen gave the new species name Bothriospondylus elongatus for the specimen. For BMNH R28632, Owen named the new species Bothriospondylus magnus, as he did not consider the two Wealden vertebrae to belong to the same taxon. Owen heavily disagreed with the interpretations of Seeley that the vertebrae were open and lightly constructed and showed relationships to birds and pterosaurs, considering the name Ornithopsis to be glaringly false and thus suggesting his new names should have priority over Seeley's older designations. Owen then reassigned B. magnus to the genus Chondrosteosaurus as Chondrosteosaurus magnus in 1876, considering it closely related to the type species Chondrosteosaurus gigas from the Wealden.

Hulke described additional sauropod material from the Wealden in 1879, and reevaluated the designations used by Owen and Seeley. Hulke identified BMNH R28632 as the type of O. hulkei, rendering Bothriospondylus magnus and Chondrosteosaurus magnus as junior objective synonyms. As well, Hulke noted that the comment of Owen that the name Ornithopsis was misleading was false, as the vertebrae were lightly-constructed regardless of their relationships. Hulke also referred the genus Eucamerotus, named earlier by him in 1870, and the genus Chondrosteusaurus to Ornithopsis as junior synonyms, with other fossils found in the Wealden beds showing that they all shared the unique internal structure of Ornithopsis. Though William Blows identified in 1995 that most of the Wealden sauropod material has been designated as dubious or intermediate, the type vertebra of Ornithopsis shows unique features in its lateral compression and a ventral ridge, and represents a diagnostic titanosauriform.

Additional species
Hulke described pelvis material, BMNH R97, from the Wealden in 1882, found associated with a few vertebrae, as the new species Ornithopsis eucamerotus. He retained Eucamerotus and Chondrosteosaurus as synonyms of Ornithopsis, but suggested that O. hulkei should only contain the original vertebra BMNH R2239. The designation by Hulke of BMNH R2239 as type conflicted with his earlier assertion that BMNH R28632 was the type, so Lydekker corrected this in 1888 by formally designated BMNH R28632 as the only type with the consultation of Seeley.

Hulke described more material as Ornithopsis in 1887, for some vertebrae, ribs, a pelvis, and fragments collected in the Eyesbury Jurassic deposits of Northamptonshire by Alfred Nicholson Leeds. The vertebrae and pelvis showed many similarities with the specimens of Ornithopsis from  the Wealden Group, but the much larger size of the Eyesbury specimens, their robusticity, and their older age were considered sufficient to describe as a new species, which Hulke named Ornithopsis leedsii after the discoverer Alfred Leeds. Hulke placed the genus within the sauropod family Atlantosauridae, suggesting a close relationship with Cetiosaurus oxoniensis. The specimens named as Ornithopsis leedsii are stored as specimens BMNH R1985-1988, having been collected in May of 1892, and possibly being the first sauropod collected by Leeds and his brothers. Unlike the other specimens, O. leedsii came from the lower Callovian deposits of the Kellaways Formation below the Oxford Clay where most specimens were derived from.

Hulke described a  found in 1868 by J.C. Mansel in the Kimmeridge Clay in 1869, considering it a large saurian possibly related to Cetiosaurus or Pelorosaurus. He then gave it the name Ischyrosaurus in 1874, reiterating its close relationship to Cetiosaurus oxoniensis, Cetiosaurus humerocristatus, and Gigantosaurus. Though it was not given a species name at the time, Richard Lydekker identified it as the species Ornithopsis manseli in 1887 based on an unpublished manuscript name provided by Hulke, as well as describing additional Wealden material as O. hulkei, and suggesting Cetiosaurus humerocristatus was a synonym of O. leedsii. Cetiosaurus oxoniensis was reassigned to Ornithopsis as O. oxoniensis in 1888 by Harry Govier Seeley, a proposal that was not endorsed at the time by Lydekker, who also suggested that O. leedsii and O. humerocristatus were possibly distinct based on a difference in age, but that Chondrosteosaurus and Ornithopsis eucamerotus were synonyms of O. hulkei. Ornithopsis leedsii was referred to as the species Pelorosaurus leedsi by Lydekker in 1895, and as the taxon Cetiosaurus leedsi by Arthur Smith Woodward in the 1905, which are incorrect spellings of the species name.

Cetiosaurus leedsii (spelled as "leedsi") had additional remains referred to it by Woodward in 1905, including the anterior caudal vertebrae BMNH R1984, the distal caudals BMNH R1967, and the posterior skeleton BMNH R3078, which preserved most of the arm, leg, pelvis, and vertebrae behind the shoulders. They species was assigned to Cetiosaurus as the vertebrae were differently textured, so Woodward considered an assignment to Cetiosaurus more proper. Friedrich von Huene did not think the referral of the species to Cetiosaurus should be supported, and referred to the taxon as "Cetiosaurus" leedsi. Huene also described the species Ornithopsis (?) greppini in the same study in 1921, for a long-tailed cetiosaurid from Jurassic deposits around Bern, Switzerland. Huene retained O. greppini in the genus in an early 1927 review of sauropods, considering the genus to contain the species Ornithopsis hulkei, O. leedsi, O. humerocristatus, O. manselli, and O. (?) greppini, with the genus representing taxon within Cetiosauridae alongside Cetiosaurus, Bothriospondylus, Pelorosaurus, Dinodocus, and possibly Rhoetosaurus and "Morosaurus" brevis. Later in the same year, Huene revised his classification, naming the new genus Cetiosauriscus for O. leedsi as described by Woodward, and O. (?) greppini.

As the holotype material of Ornithopsis/Cetiosauriscus leedsii was not considered diagnostic, the more complete specimen BMNH R3078 was referred to the new taxon Cetiosauriscus stewarti, which was then designated as the type species of Cetiosauriscus as it contained the material Huene had originally named the new genus for. Cetiosaurus leedsi was then assigned to an intermediate member of Brachiosauridae, considered to be a proper species of Ornithopsis, or an improper species of Ornithopsis that is an indeterminate eusauropod. Ornithopsis greppini was given the new genus name Amanzia in a 2020 redescription of the original material.

As Ischyrosaurus was used earlier by Edward Drinker Cope for the non-mammalian genus Ischyrotherium in 1869, the name "Ischyrosaurus" cannot be used for I. manseli, and so the species was retained as Ornithopsis manseli by David Martill and colleagues in 2006. The species has also been considered as Pelorosaurus manseli. Upchurch et al., in their review of sauropods (2004), listed it as a dubious sauropod. A 2010 overview of Late Jurassic sauropods from Dorset noted that O. manseli shared features seen in both Rebbachisauridae and Titanosauriformes, but lacked features to nail down its exact phylogenetic position.

Description
The Ornithopsis hulkei holotype is basically a centrum lacking the neural spine. The vertebra is heavily pneumatised, filled with large cavities, camellae. It is narrow, tall, has a ridge on the underside, is opisthocoelous and has a posteriorly placed deep subtriangular pleurocoel over two thirds of its length. These features are compatible with a placement within the Titanosauriformes.

References

External links
 Discussion of Ornithopsis with image

Sauropods
Barremian life
Early Cretaceous dinosaurs of Europe
Cretaceous England
Fossils of England
Fossil taxa described in 1870
Taxa named by Harry Seeley